The 2015–16 San Diego Toreros men's basketball team represented the University of San Diego during the 2015–16 NCAA Division I men's basketball season. This was head coach Lamont Smith's first season at San Diego.  The Toreros competed in the West Coast Conference and played their home games at the Jenny Craig Pavilion. They finished the season 9–21, 4–14 in WCC play to finish in last place. They lost in the first round of the WCC tournament to Loyola Marymount.

Previous season
The Toreros finished the season 15–16, 8–10 in WCC play to finish in fifth place. They lost in the quarterfinals of the WCC tournament to Pepperdine.

Departures

Recruits class of 2015

Roster

Schedule and results

|-
!colspan=12 style="background:#002654; color:#97CAFF;"| Exhibition

|-
!colspan=12 style="background:#002654; color:#97CAFF;"| Non-conference regular season

|-
!colspan=12 style="background:#002654; color:#97CAFF;"| WCC regular season

|-
!colspan=9 style="background:#002654;"| WCC tournament

See also
2015–16 San Diego Toreros women's basketball team

References

San Diego Toreros men's basketball seasons
San Diego